This is a list of members of the South Australian Legislative Council between 1993 and 1997. As half of the Legislative Council's terms expired at each state election, half of these members were elected at the 1989 state election with terms expiring in 1997, while the other half were elected at the 1993 state election with terms expiring in 2002.

 Democrat MLC Ian Gilfillan resigned on 18 November 1993. Former MLC Mike Elliott was appointed to the resulting casual vacancy on 10 February 1994.
 Labor MLC Chris Sumner resigned on 7 October 1994. Terry Cameron was appointed to the resulting casual vacancy on 13 September 1994.
 Labor MLC Barbara Wiese resigned on 15 September 1995. Paul Holloway was appointed to the resulting casual vacancy on 26 September 1995.
 Labor MLC Mario Feleppa resigned on 4 October 1995. Paolo Nocella was appointed to the resulting casual vacancy on 10 October 1995.

References

 "Statistical Record of the Legislature, 1837–2007", Parliament of South Australia, 2007.
 "History of South Australian Elections, 1857–2006", Dean Jaensch, 2006.

Members of South Australian parliaments by term
20th-century Australian politicians